Guillermo Durán and Andrés Molteni were the defending champions but only Molteni chose to defend his title, partnering Guido Andreozzi. Molteni lost in the first round to Franco Agamenone and Federico Zeballos.

Ariel Behar and Fabiano de Paula won the title after defeating Marcelo Arévalo and Sergio Galdós 6–2, 6–4 in the final.

Seeds

Draw

References
 Main Draw

Challenger Ciudad de Guayaquil - Doubles